The House of Ypsilantis or Ypsilanti was a Greek Phanariote family which grew into prominence and power in Constantinople during the last centuries of Ottoman Empire and gave several short-reign hospodars to the Danubian Principalities.

History 
First mentioned in 1064, the family was originally from the Pontus region in the Black Sea. They became prominent during the Empire of Trebizond. In 1655, Antiochus Ypsilantis left Trabzon and settled in Constantinople. Since the end of the Ottoman Empire, members of the Ypsilanti family can be found all over the world.

Notable members 
 Alexander Ypsilantis (1725 - 1805), Prince of Wallachia and Moldavia
 Constantine Ypsilantis (?–1816), son of the above, Prince of Moldavia, fled to the Russian court
 Alexander Ypsilantis (1792 - 1828), eldest son of the above. A General in the Imperial Russian Army, he became the leader of the Filiki Eteria, and began the Greek Revolution in 1821 by crossing over with his followers into the Danubian Principalities. Defeated by Ottoman forces, he retreated to Austria, where he died in 1828.
 Demetrios Ypsilantis (1793–1832), second son of Constantine Ypsilantis, one of the early leaders of the Greek Revolution, later General under John Capodistria. The city of Ypsilanti, Michigan is named after him.

References

Ypsilantis family
Phanariotes
Greek noble families
Romanian boyar families
Romanian people of Greek descent